The state of Serbia and Montenegro ceased to exist in 2006. The following articles cover telecommunications in the successor states:

Telecommunications in Serbia
Telecommunications in Montenegro